Ohio Township is one of the eighteen townships of Monroe County, Ohio, United States. As of the 2020 census, the population was 837.

Geography
Located in the eastern part of the county along the Ohio River, it borders the following townships:
Salem Township - north
Lee Township - southwest
Green Township - northwest
West Virginia lies across the Ohio River to the east: Marshall County farther north, and Wetzel County farther south.

No municipalities are located in Ohio Township, although the unincorporated community of Hannibal lies in the township's east along the Ohio River.

Name and history
Statewide, other Ohio Townships are located in Clermont and Gallia counties.

Government
The township is governed by a three-member board of trustees, who are elected in November of odd-numbered years to a four-year term beginning on the following January 1. Two are elected in the year after the presidential election and one is elected in the year before it. There is also an elected township fiscal officer, who serves a four-year term beginning on April 1 of the year after the election, which is held in November of the year before the presidential election. Vacancies in the fiscal officership or on the board of trustees are filled by the remaining trustees.

References

External links
County website

Townships in Monroe County, Ohio
Townships in Ohio